A/S Jotunheimen og Valdresruten Bilselskap (JVB) is a transport company with headquarters in Fagernes, Nord-Aurdal in Innlandet county, Norway. In 2009, the company had a turnover of kr. 96.981.000,- and is currently the largest road transport company in Oppland based in the county. JVB has 120 employees and has daily routes in Valdres, Land and from Fagernes to Gol, Lærdal, Gjendesheim, Gjøvik and Oslo. The company mainly deals with personal transport by bus.

History
JVB was founded on 21 November 1919 after Automobil A/S "Jotunheim" and A/S Valdresrutens Automobilselskap joined together on the same day as dissolving themselves. JVB's bus operations can therefore be traced back to 1909. By summer 1910, the two companies had a total of 11 buses in operation from Fagernes. No other place in Norway had this number of vehicles in operation. 
In 1944, MB Bitihorn was taken over by JVB.
In 1947, JVB took over the route to Ola Paulsrud in Øystre Slidre.
In 1952, JVB began tour buses for Winge Reisebureau and "Norwegian Fjord Lines" tours between Oslo and Bergen.
In 1953, (15 August) JVB and Ola Westheim bought the bus "Vesle-Venus" as the first bus to travel through Valdresflya.
In 1954, JVB took over L/L Valdres Lastebilselskap, and JVB took over all personal passengers. 
In 1956, JVB took over Anton Sørumshaugen's route between Fagernes and Aurdal.

Company services
Local bus routes
School routes
MB Bitihorn to Bygdin
Beltebilruta from Tyin to Eidsbugarden
Express busses which cross counties to and from large towns such as Bergen, Oslo, Lillehammer, Hønefoss
Valdresekspressen (Oslo-Fagernes-Beitostølen / Tyin - Årdal)
Øst-Vest Xpressen (Lillehammer-Fagernes-Sogn-Bergen)

Daughter companies
JVB Tur AS
NorXpress AS
JVB Travel AS

References

Books
Iversen, Ingolf, Jubileumsbok for Jotunheimen og Valdresruten bilselskap :75 år - 1994

External links
 Company website
 JVB Tur AS
 JVB Travel AS

Bus companies of Innlandet
Companies based in Innlandet
Valdres
Transport companies established in 1919
Norwegian companies established in 1919